Ommatissopyrops schawerdae is a moth in the Epipyropidae family. It was described by Zerny in 1929. It is found in Spain and Israel.

The length of the forewings is about 5 mm. The forewings are triangular, with a sharp point. They are weakly shining blackish-grey. The hindwings are much smaller, with a rounded margin. The colouration is the same as for the forewings.

The larvae have been recorded feeding on the nymphs of Hysteropterum maculipes.

Etymology
The species is named for the Austrian Lepidopterist Dr. Karl Schawerda.

References

Moths described in 1929
Epipyropidae